Presidential elections were held in Chile on 4 September 1958. The result was a victory for Jorge Alessandri, who ran as an independent. Allende's defeat has been commonly attributed to Antonio Zamorano, also known as "Cura de Catapilco", entering the race as a populist left-wing candidate and taking votes from Allende's electorate. This explanation has been questioned by modern research that infers Zamorano took votes from across the political spectrum. The "Catapilco" effect remains a trope in Chilean electoral discourse used to indicate a candidate that finishes third and is believed to have hindered the runner-up.

Electoral system
The election was held using the absolute majority system, under which a candidate had to receive over 50% of the popular vote to be elected. If no candidate received over 50% of the vote, both houses of the National Congress would come together to vote on the two candidates that received the most votes.

Results

References

Presidential elections in Chile
Chile
President
Chile